James Habersham Jr. ( – July 2, 1799) was an American merchant, slave trader, planter and politician who served as the speaker of the Georgia General Assembly in 1782 and 1784.

Early life

Habersham was born in Savannah, Georgia , the son of James and Mary Habersham. He was the youngest brother of Joseph Habersham and John Habersham, who were prominent Patriots during the American Revolution. For his part, James provided political and financial service. Habersham attended the College of New Jersey, but did not graduate. He is believed to be the first student from Georgia to attend the college. Habersham subsequently married Hester Wylly, who was born in Ireland.

Mercantile career

Though according to his father, Habersham was "gentleman that is not overly fond of business", he founded a mercantile firm which specialized in importing goods with his cousin Joseph Clay in the 1760's. The firm imported hundreds of African slaves to Savannah, some of which were advertised as being "direct from the River Gambia". Habersham also owned slave plantations on both the Savannah River and Broad River in South Carolina. He also served on the board of trustees which established the University of Georgia in 1785.

Habersham House
In 1789, construction was completed of Habersham House in Savannah's Reynolds Square. Habersham lived there until his death on July 2, 1799.  He is buried in Savannah's Colonial Park Cemetery.

References

External links

1745 births
1799 deaths
American planters
American slave owners
American slave traders
Colonial American merchants
Princeton University alumni
Speakers of the Georgia House of Representatives